Bonabéri is a port in the Littoral Region of Cameroon.  It is located on the western side of the harbour across the Wouri River from the larger port of Douala.

Districts 
Bonaberi has 10 districts: 
 Bojongo
 Bonamatoumbe
 Bonamikano
 Bonassama
 Bonendale I
 Bonendale II
 Djebale I
 Djebale II
 Mambanda
 Nkomba

Administration  
Municipality has been headed by a mayor since 1987.

Transport 

It is served by a station on the national railway system.

Views of Bonaberi

Notable people 

 Ernestine Gwet Bell - gynaecologist who supervised the birth of Cameroon's first IVF baby, worked at Council of Baptist and Evangelical Churches Hospital.

See also 
 Douala
 Railway stations in Cameroon
Communes of Cameroon

References

External links 
 Bonaberi.com
 Bonaberi photo gallery

Populated places in Littoral Region (Cameroon)